Holohory (- Gologory) is a hill range in the northwestern part of Podolian Upland, Ukraine, stretching from Lviv to Zolochiv, constituting part of the European watershed. The name literally means "bare mountains".

References

Hills of Ukraine
Podolia
Zolochiv Raion, Lviv Oblast
Geography of Lviv Oblast